Mar Isaac may refer to:

 Mar Isaac (bishop), early bishop of Seleucia
 Isaac the Syrian, d. ca. 700
 Mar Isaac of Firuz Shapur, Gaon of the Jewish Yeshiva academy in Firuz Shapur, Babylon